William Henry Lewis (1869 – 25 May 1963) was Professor of Chemistry at the University of Exeter for more than 30 years.

Lewis was educated at University College of Wales, Aberystwyth (as it was then known) and Jesus College, Oxford.  After graduating, he was a science teacher at Exeter School for seven years, before being appointed Professor of Chemistry at University College, Exeter (as it was then known) in 1901.  From 1925 until his retirement in 1935, he combined his position as Professor with that of Vice-Principal of the College, helping to publicise the institution throughout Devon. In his role as Professor, he was regarded as having built up the Chemistry department from nothing into a "strong and vital unit." He served on the council of the Royal Institute of Chemistry from 1924 to 1927.  He was awarded an honorary doctorate by Exeter University in 1957.

References

1869 births
1963 deaths
Alumni of Aberystwyth University
Alumni of Jesus College, Oxford
British chemists
Academics of the University of Exeter